Neopleurotomoides is a genus of sea snails, marine gastropod mollusks in the family Raphitomidae.

Species
Species within the genus Neopleurotomoides include:
 Neopleurotomoides aembe Figueira & Absalão, 2012
 Neopleurotomoides callembryon (Dautzenberg & Fischer, 1896)
 Neopleurotomoides distinctus Bouchet & Warén, 1980
 Neopleurotomoides rufoapicata (Schepman, 1913)
Species brought into synonymy
 Neopleurotomoides callembyron (Dautzenberg & Fischer, 1896): synonym of Neopleurotomoides callembryon (Dautzenberg & Fischer, 1896)
 Neopleurotomoides distincta Bouchet & Waren, 1980: synonym of Neopleurotomoides distinctus Bouchet & Warén, 1980 (wrong grammatical agreement of species name)

References

External links
 
 Worldwide Mollusc Species Data Base: Raphitomidae
 Shuto, Tsugio. "Taxonomical notes on the turrids of the Siboga-Collection originally described by MM Schepman, 1931 (part III)." Venus (Japanese Journal of Malacology) 30.1 (1971): 5-_22

 
Raphitomidae
Gastropod genera